The Graduate School of Biomedical Sciences (GSBS; formerly known as UMDNJ-GSBS) was one of eight schools that formed the University of Medicine and Dentistry of New Jersey (UMDNJ). After the July 1, 2013 dissolution of UMDNJ, the students attending GSBS on the Newark and Piscataway campuses joined the newly created Rutgers University Graduate School of Biomedical Sciences, while the students attending GSBS on the Stratford campus joined the newly established  Rowan University Graduate School of Biomedical Sciences.

External links
Rowan University Graduate School of Biomedical Sciences
Rutgers University Graduate School of Biomedical Sciences

Rutgers University colleges and schools
University of Medicine and Dentistry of New Jersey
Graduate schools in the United States
Education in Newark, New Jersey
Educational institutions established in 1956
1956 establishments in New Jersey